This is the Korean War order of battle. Subsidiary commands are listed on sub-pages. Where no date is shown for a command, assume it present at the start of the war, on June 25, 1950.

Pro-Southern forces: United Nations and Republic of Korea

Republic of Korea Armed Forces (prior to June 25, 1950)
  Republic of Korea Armed Forces
  Capital Guard Command, Seoul & Ongjin
 3rd Infantry Regiment
 8th Infantry Regiment
 17th Infantry Regiment
 18th Infantry Regiment
 1st Cavalry Regiment
  1st Infantry Division, Kaesong
 11th Infantry Regiment
 12th Infantry Regiment
 13th Infantry Regiment
  2nd Infantry Division, Daejeon
 5th Infantry Regiment
 16th Infantry Regiment
 25th Infantry Regiment
  3rd Infantry Division, Daegu
 22nd Infantry Regiment
 23rd Infantry Regiment
  5th Infantry Division, Gwangju
 15th Infantry Regiment
 20th Infantry Regiment
  6th Infantry Division, Chuncheon & Wonju
 2nd Infantry Regiment
 7th Infantry Regiment
 19th Infantry Regiment
  7th Infantry Division, Dongducheon
 1st Infantry Regiment
 3rd Infantry Regiment
 9th Infantry Regiment
  8th Infantry Division, Gangneung & Jumunjin
 10th Infantry Regiment
 21st Infantry Regiment
  9th Infantry Division, Seoul (from October 1950)
 28th Infantry Regiment
 29th Infantry Regiment
 30th Infantry Regiment

United Nations ground forces

 General Headquarters United Nations Command (Korea) (UNC) — Formally activated 10 July 1950, before then allied forces were formally under American operational control.
 US Army Forces Far East
  Eighth Army - Combination of ROK infantry divisions and UN forces
  I Corps
  IX Corps
  X Corps: September 15, 1950 to December 24, 1950.
 United States ground forces (with attached UN units)
  2nd Infantry Division
 French Battalion
 Dutch Battalion (from early 1951)
  3rd Infantry Division
 Belgian Battalion (from February 1951)
 Luxembourg Platoon (from February 1951)
 Greek Battalion
  7th Infantry Division
 Colombian Battalion
 Ethiopian "Kagnew" Battalion
  24th Infantry Division
  25th Infantry Division
 Turkish Brigade
 10th Philippine Battalion Combat Team
  40th Infantry Division
  45th Infantry Division
  1st Cavalry Division
 Thai Battalion
  187th Airborne Infantry Regiment
  5th Infantry Regiment
 United Nations divisions under overall US command:
  27th British Commonwealth Brigade (from August 1950-July 1951)
 British 28th Infantry Brigade (from April–June 1951)
  British 29th Infantry Brigade (from November 1950-July 1951)
  1st Commonwealth Division (from July 1951)
 Canadian 25th Brigade
 Australian Battalions
 New Zealand Battery
 US Marine Corps
  1st Marine Division
 Provisional Marine Brigade 1950
  1st Marine Aircraft Wing
  Republic of Korea Army
 ROK I Corps
 ROK II Corps

United Nations Naval Forces
  Naval Forces Far East
  United States Seventh Fleet (from June 27, 1950)
 Task Force 90
 Task Force 95 (from September 12, 1950)
 Task Force 96
 British Far East Fleet (from June 28, 1950)

United Nations Air Forces
 US Far East Air Forces
 31st Strategic Reconnaissance Squadron (Photographic) (from June 29-November 15, 1950)
 91st Strategic Reconnaissance Squadron (Medium, Photographic) (from November 15, 1950)
  Fifth Air Force
 Far East Air Forces Bomber Command
  Twentieth Air Force

Other
 Italian Red Cross
 Danish Hospital Ship
  Indian 60th Parachute Field Ambulance
 Swedish Hospital
 Norwegian MASH Unit "NORMASH"

Pro-Northern forces: People's Republic of Korea and China

North Korean forces
  Korean People's Army
 1st NKPA Division
 2nd NKPA Division
 3rd NKPA Division
 4th NKPA Division
 5th NKPA Division
 6th NKPA Division
 12th NKPA Division
 10th NKPA Division
 13th NKPA Division
 15th NKPA Division
 105th Armoured Brigade
 206th Mechanized Infantry Brigade

Notes: 
 NKPA infantry divisions 1 through 7 were regular force infantry divisions used in the attack on South Korea, while the 10th, 13th, and 15th were reserve units used for security.

Chinese forces

 People's Volunteers Army  November 23, 1950
 XIII Army Group - General Deng Hua
 38th Army - General Liang Xingchu
 112th Division (334th, 335th, 336th Regts)
 113th Division (337th, 338th, 339th Regts)
 114th Division (340th, 341st, 342d Regts)
 39th Army - General Wu Xinquan
 115th Division (343d, 344th, 345th Regts)
 116th Division (346th, 347th, 348th Regts)
 117th Division (349th, 350th, 351st Regts)
 40th Army - General Wen Yucheng
 118th Division (352d, 353d, 354th Regts)
 119th Division (355th, 356th, 357th Regts)
 120th Division (358th, 359th, 360th Regts)
 42nd Army - General Wu Ruilin
 124th Division (370th, 371st, 372d Regts)
 125th Division (373d, 374th, 375th Regts)
 126th Division (376th, 377th, 378th Regts)
 50th Army - General Zeng Zesheng
 148th Division (442d, 443d, 444th Regts)
 149th Division (445th, 446th, 447th Regts)
 150th Division (448th, 449th, 450th Regts)
 66th Army - General Xiao Xinhuai
 196th Division (586th, 587th, 588th Regts)
 197th Division (589th, 590th, 591st Regts)
 198th Division (592d, 593d, 594th Regts)
 1st Motorised Artillery Division (25th, 26th, 27th Regts)
 2nd Motorised Artillery Division (28th, 29th, 30th Regts)
 8th Motorised Artillery Division (31st, 44th, 45th Regts)
 IX Army Group - General Song Shi-Lun
 20th Army - General Zhang Yixiang
 58th Division (172d, 173d, 174th Regts)
 59th Division (175th, 176th, 177th Regts)
 60th Division (178th, 179th, 180th Regts)
 89th Division (265th, 266th, 267th Regts)
 26th Army - General Zhang Renchu
 76th Division (226th, 227th, 228th Regts)
 77th Division (229th, 230th, 231st Regts)
 78th Division (232d, 233d, 234th, Regts)
 88th Division (262d, 263d, 264th Regts)
 27th Army - General Peng Deqing
 79th Division (235th, 236th, 237th Regts)
 80th Division (238th, 239th, 240th Regts)
 81st Division (241st, 242nd, 243d Regts)
 90th Div (268th, 269th, 270th Regts)
 III Army Group - General Chen Geng
 12th Army - General Zeng Shaoshan
 15th Army - General Qin Jiwei
 60th Army - General Wei Jie
 179th Division
 180th Division
 181st Division
 XIX Army Group - General Yang Dezhi
 63rd Army - General Fu Congbi
 64th Army - General Zeng Siyu
 65th Army - General Xiao Yingtang

Soviet Union
 [Unofficial] 64th Fighter Aviation Corps

Other
Foreign Medical Continents
 Bulgarian Red Cross
 Czechoslovak Field Hospital (from 1952)

See also

 US Eighth Army Korean War order of battle
 US Seventh Fleet Korean War order of battle
 USAF units and aircraft of the Korean War

References

Sources 

Order of battle